Milena Dvorská (7 September 1938 – 22 December 2009) was a Czech film actress. She appeared in 70 films and television shows between 1955 and 2009.

Selected filmography
 Anděl na horách (1956)
 Nejlepší ženská mého života (1968)
 The Last Act of Martin Weston (1970)
 The Little Mermaid (1976)
 Marecek, Pass Me the Pen! (1976)
 Do Be Quick (1977)
 Jára Cimrman Lying, Sleeping (1983)
 My Sweet Little Village (1985)
 Noc smaragdového měsíce (1985)

References

External links
 

1938 births
2009 deaths
Czech film actresses
Actors from Prostějov
Czech television actresses
20th-century Czech actresses
21st-century Czech actresses